Miao Room is the largest known cave chamber by volume in the world. It is a part of the Gebihe cave system, which is located in Ziyun Getu He National Park, in Ziyun county of the Chinese province of Guizhou.
In 2013 members of a British led expedition measured the chamber using 3-D laser scanners.

Geology and formation 
For more than 600 million years the area, in which the Gebihe cave system is located, was covered by sea and during this time it accumulated miles-thick layers of sediments, including limestone. The uplift of the area and then the erosion of the limestone layer created today's massive cavern system.

The system spreads out in limestones and dolomite of Carboniferous and Permian age. Old cave levels have been cut by erosion and follow the base level lowering caused by Tertiary uplift.

See also 
 South China Karst
 Sarawak Chamber

References

Caves of Guizhou
Limestone caves
Wild caves